Calvente is a Spanish surname. Notable people with the surname include:

Ezequiel Calvente (born 1991), Spanish footballer
Manuel Calvente (born 1976), Spanish cyclist

Spanish-language surnames